Joseph McNamara (May 2, 1866 – December 30, 1916), known professionally as Reddy Mack, was an Irish-born professional baseball player. He played professional baseball from 1885 to 1890, mainly as a second baseman. Mack played the first four years of his career with the Louisville Colonels, before joining the Baltimore Orioles for the final years of his career. Through his career, he proved to be a mediocre hitter and fielder, except for the 1887 season, where he hit .308 with 147 hits in 128 games. 

Mack died in Newport, Kentucky from an accidental fall.

See also
List of Major League Baseball single-game hits leaders

References 

Major League Baseball second basemen
Louisville Colonels players
Baltimore Orioles (AA) players
Major League Baseball players from Ireland
Irish baseball players
Accidental deaths in Kentucky
1866 births
1916 deaths
Dayton Gem Citys players
Buffalo Bisons (minor league) players
Providence Grays (minor league) players
Nashville Tigers players
Binghamton Bingoes players
Allentown Buffaloes players
Hartford Bluebirds players
Dubuque Tigers players
Dallas Steers players
Montgomery Senators players
Fairmont Champions players
Irish emigrants to the United States (before 1923)
Accidental deaths from falls
19th-century baseball players
Baltimore Orioles (Atlantic Association) players
Montgomery Miners players
Sportspeople from Belfast